Anna Alexandrovna Baranchuk (born 18 December 1993) is a Russian rugby sevens player. She competed in the women's tournament at the 2020 Summer Olympics.

References

External links
 
 
 

1993 births
Living people
Russian female rugby sevens players
Olympic rugby sevens players of Russia
Rugby sevens players at the 2020 Summer Olympics
People from Prokopyevsk
Sportspeople from Kemerovo Oblast